Don is a 2007 Indian Telugu-language action film written and directed by Raghava Lawrence. It stars Nagarjuna along with Raghava Lawrence, Anushka Shetty, while Nikita Thukral and Kelly Dorji play the main antagonists. Don was produced by M. L. Kumar Chowdary on Sri Keerthi Creations banner. Raghava Lawrence debuted as a music composer with the film. Don was released on 20 December 2007 and was average at the box office.

The film was later dubbed and released in Hindi as Don No. 1 in 2008 and in Tamil under the same title. Don was remade in Bangladesh as  Don Number 1 (2012) and in Odia as Don (2010).

Plot
1987: Surya aka Suri finds a drug dealer tormenting little boys. Surya guns down the drug dealer and one of the boys, Raghava, expresses his wish to join him where the rest of the boys become Surya's friends and eventually his henchmen.

2007: Surya is a don with a golden heart and Raghava is his lieutenant. They rule the underworld of Andhra Pradesh together and help the police to bust down corrupt activities. Stephen is a feared don from Mumbai, who had killed a don from Goa in a duel with each other where the person will lose two of his men for each fall he takes, eventually keeping his wife as a mistress and ruling the state. Stephen wants to add Andhra Pradesh to his underworld business with someone working under him. He sends S.P. Bhushan, one of his henchmen to get information about the local don of this state. No one in the police department knows who the traitor is and Bhushan is appointed for the case about Stephen by the Inspector General of the police, he goes to every VIP person in the state but only one of them (who is revealed to be a pharmaceutical company owner and Surya's business partner) accepts Stephen's proposal. After Surya knows this, he is killed by Surya's henchmen. Bhushan rapes and kills a minister's daughter whom he saw during the proposal with the minister. Surya kills Bhushan at a pub and Raghava along with the public blames the rape victim for killing him as he raped her. Surya reveals everything about Bhushan, reconciles with the I.G., and tells him whether everyone in the department should be verified for not being a corrupt official or a traitor, or even a spy. The I.G. seeks forgiveness and Surya forgives him. Anthony informs about the death of Bhushan and Stephen understands how powerful he is. Stephen then tells Anthony that he wants Surya to arrive in Mumbai, but is forced by Surya's older henchmen (Jeeva) to arrive in Andhra Pradesh. Surya refuses to work with Stephen and warns him that he should never set eyes on the state again after a meeting arranged by Surya in Andhra Pradesh and disclosing each other's biodata. Enraged, Stephen arranges many attempts to kill Surya, but Stephen's men get killed. Rathnam wants to kill Raghava as Raghava killed his son for making everyone addicted to drugs in a college, but Raghava kills Rathnam because the latter had hosted a hideout for Stephen in Hyderabad and tried to do several bomb blasts, attack Raghava and defeat Surya. Meanwhile, Surya falls in love with Priya. At first, she does not like him but later finds that he is a good person and reciprocated. 

Raghava also finds a girl Nandhini and falls for her, who accepts his feelings. In the process, he is cornered, and Nandhini is revealed to be Stephen's henchwoman. Raghava is killed after killing Nandhini. In a final meeting between Surya and Stephen, the latter returns Raghava's corpse. Stephen challenges Surya to a fight on the condition that (a person will lose two of his men for each fall he takes). Enraged and heartbroken by Raghava's death, Surya accepts his challenge. As the combat progresses where Surya loses two of his men. Determined to win, Surya continues the fight and thrashes up Stephen and his two women bodyguards. The fight ends with Stephen getting killed by Surya, avenging Raghava's death and Surya warns Stephen's remaining henchmen, not to be like their boss and finally, Surya becomes the unopposed don of India.

Cast

 Nagarjuna as Surya aka Suri
 Anushka Shetty as Priya
 Raghava Lawrence as Raghava, Surya's sworn brother
 Nikita Thukral as Nandhini
 Kelly Dorji as Stephen 
 Chetan Hansraj as Anthony 
 Kota Srinivasa Rao as Rathnam
 Nassar as I.G.
 Chalapathi Rao as Murthy
 Supreeth as Bihar goon
 Salim Baig as Robin
 Jeeva as Suri's henchman
 Madhusudhan Rao as Drug Dealer
 Vizag Prasad

Soundtrack

The music was composed by Raghava Lawrence. The music was released by Aditya Music Company.

References

External links 
 

2007 films
2000s Telugu-language films
Telugu films remade in other languages
2000s masala films
Indian action films
Indian gangster films
2007 action films
Films directed by Raghava Lawrence